The Italian Synagogue, also known as Kal de los Frankos, is a synagogue located north of the Golden Horn in Istanbul, Turkey. The synagogue was established by the Italian Jewish community of Istanbul, (Comunità Israelitico-Italiana di Istanbul), in the 19th century. In 1931 the original building was demolished and a new synagogue was built in its place.

See also
History of the Jews in Turkey
List of synagogues in Turkey

References

External links
Chief Rabbinate of Turkey
Shalom Newspaper - The main Jewish newspaper in Turkey

Synagogues in Istanbul
Beyoğlu
Golden Horn
Italian diaspora in Europe
Synagogues completed in 1931
1931 establishments in Turkey
Gothic Revival architecture in Turkey
Gothic Revival synagogues
Italian-Jewish diaspora
Italki Jews topics
20th-century religious buildings and structures in Turkey